Hollola is a municipality of Finland, located in the western part of the Päijänne Tavastia region.

Hollola has the tallest structure in Finland, the Tiirismaa TV-Tower.

A popular resort in Hollola is Messilä. There you can do cross-country-skiing, downhill skiing, tramping and play golf. There is a hotel and a camping site in Messilä. Messilä is located by Vesijärvi.

In 2018, Hollola hosted the Jukola Relays. This Orienteering event is a night relay, and one of the most popular orienteering events in the world by number of competitors.

International relations

Twin towns — Sister cities
Hollola is twinned with:

  Arboga, Sweden  
  Nordkapp, Norway
  Ebeltoft, Denmark

References

External links
 
 Municipality of Hollola – Official website

 
Populated places established in 1865